Tim Douglas Cronin (born April 2, 1984) is a Canadian boxer of Irish descent who competes as a Light Heavyweight. He is currently ranked as #8 in the BoxRec Canadian Light Heavyweight rankings.

Professional career
On February 27, 2017, Cronin faced Mexican boxer Guillermo Herrera Campos. The. Fight ended in a contriversal draw after an accidental head caused a cut to Campos in the first minute of the opening round.

On July 28, 2017, Cronin faced Slovakian boxer Kristof Demendi in a six-round bout. He won the fight via unanimous decision.

On March 21, 2017, it was announced that Cronin would face Nathan Miller on April 4, 2017, for the Vacant NCC Light Heavyweight Title. He won the fight via unanimous decision to become the NCC Light Heavyweight Champion.

On May 30, 2017, it was announced that Cronin would face Montreal fighter Louisbert Altidor. He won the fight via an eight-round split decision.

Championships and accomplishments
National Championship of Canada
NCC Light Heavyweight Championship (One time)

Professional boxing record

References

External links

Tim Cronin - Facebook

Living people
Light-heavyweight boxers
Super-middleweight boxers
Canadian male boxers
Sportspeople from Etobicoke
Boxers from Toronto
1984 births